John Wolstenholme is an English cricketer.

John Wolstenholme may also refer to:

John Wolstenholme (merchant) (1562–1639)
Sir John Wolstenholme, 1st Baronet (c. 1596–1670)
Sir John Wolstenholme, 3rd Baronet (1649–1709), MP for Middlesex (UK Parliament constituency)
Jack Wolstenholme (1851–1914), New Zealand cricketer